Parliamentary elections were held in Portugal on 23 October 1892.

Results

The results exclude the six seats won at national level and those from overseas territories.

References

Legislative elections in Portugal
Portugal
1892 elections in Portugal
October 1892 events